Tamriko Siprashvili (born January 2, 1963) is a Georgian pianist. She was born in  Tbilisi the capital city of the Republic of Georgia.

Training 
She began her piano studies at the age of three. At age five, she entered the Special Music School for Gifted Children in her home city of Tbilisi, one of only four such schools in the then–Soviet Union. There she continued her studies until at 17, she was accepted into the Moscow Conservatory of Music to be a concert pianist. In 1985, she graduated with her Doctorate in Musicology and Piano Performance. While at the Moscow Conservatory she studied primarily with Mikhail Voskresensky.

Awards 
After graduation Tamriko competed for and won 1st Prize, Gold, in the IX Robert Schumann International Competition for Pianists and Singers in Zwickau, Germany.

Steinway Artist 

Tamriko is a Steinway Artist, sharing her love of music and Steinway pianos.

Concerts 
After she received her 1st prize, Tamriko then toured throughout Europe, the United States and Argentina, performing as soloist with such notable orchestras as the Berlin Konzerthaus; the Leipzig Gewandhaus Orchestra; the Arturo Toscanini Philharmonic Orchestra in Parma, Italy; and the Oakland Symphony among many others. While on tour, she had the honor of performing with legendary conductors Kurt Masur, Jason Kakhidze and Michael Morgan.

Music Academy and Musical Legacy 
In 1995 Tamriko moved to Northern California and in early 2009, she opened a music academy named Inspire Academy of Music and Arts] in Pleasanton, California. She opened the academy with the sole purpose of sharing her love of music and continuing her pursuit of a musical education for young children.

Students 
Many of Tamriko's students have gone on to earn and enjoy their own personal successes. Those  include international prizes and admission to such highly regarded music universities such as the Eastman School of Music; University of Texas, Austin; NYU; UCLA; and the Manhattan School of Music.

Recordings 
Tamriko is known for her romantic repertoire, especially that of Robert Schumann. To bring some of her favorite pieces to the public, and to pass on her rich heritage of music, she has recorded several albums for Nimbus Records, among them Mussorgsky's Pictures at an Exhibition and Stravinsky's Rite of Spring. On the French label XCP Records, she recorded  Kreisler's "Liebesfreud" and "Liebesleid" as well as the "Variations on a Theme by Chopin Opus 22," and "Variations on a Theme by Corelli Opus 42," by Sergei Rachmaninoff–to worldwide acclaim.

External links 
  Inspire Academy of Music and Arts
  Steinway & Sons
  ArkivMusic - Discography
  Robert Schumann International Contest for Pianists and Singers

Living people
Soviet emigrants to the United States
Classical pianists from Georgia (country)
Women pianists from Georgia (country)
Classical piano duos
People from Pleasanton, California
21st-century classical pianists
1963 births
21st-century women pianists